Geoffrey Russell Searle, born 1941, is a British historian, specialising in British nineteenth century history. He is Emeritus Professor at the University of East Anglia.

Works

The Quest for National Efficiency: A Study in British Politics and Political Thought, 1899-1914 (1971).
Eugenics and Politics in Britain, 1900-1914 (1976).
Corruption in British Politics, 1895-1930 (1987).
The Liberal Party: Triumph and Disintegration, 1886-1929  (1992).
Entrepreneurial Politics in Mid-Victorian Britain (1993).
Country Before Party: Coalition and the Idea of National Government in Modern Britain, 1885-1987 (1995).
Morality and the Market in Victorian Britain (1998).
A New England? Peace and War 1886-1918 (2004), part of the New Oxford History of England.

References

British historians
Academics of the University of East Anglia
1941 births
Living people